This is an alphabetical list of the fungal taxa as recorded from South Africa. Currently accepted names have been appended.

La
Order: Laboulbeniales

Family: Laboulbeniaceae

Genus: Laboulbenia
Laboulbenia anomala Thaxt.
Laboulbenia bilabiata Thaxt.
Laboulbenia dryptae Thaxt.

Genus: Laccaria
Laccaria laccata Berk. & Br.

Genus: Lacellina
Lacellina graminicola Petch.

Genus: Lachnea
Lachnea capensis v.d.Byl.
Lachnea capensis Lloyd
Lachnea hemispherica Gill.
Lachnea lusatiae Cooke

Genus: Lachnocladium
Lachnocladium cristatum Lloyd
Lachnocladium furcellatum Lev.
Lachnocladium semivestitum Berk. & Curt.
Lachnocladium zenkeri P.Henn.

Genus: Lactarium
Lactarium deliciosus S.F.Gray
Lactarium piperatus S.F.Gray
Lactarium scrobiculatus Fr.

Genus: Lagenula
Lagenula fructicola Amaud.

Genus: Lamprospora
Lamprospora leiocarpa Seaver.

Genus: Lanopila
Lanopila capensis  Lloyd
Lanopila radloffiana Verw.
Lanopila wahlbergii Fr.

Genus: Laschia
Laschia auriscalpium Mont.
Laschia cucullata Bres.
Laschia duthiei Lloyd
Laschia friesiana P.Henn.
Laschia rubella Sacc.
Laschia tenerrima Kalchbr.
Laschia thwaitesii Berk. & Br.
Laschia sp.

Genus: Lasiobolus
Lasiobolus equinus Karst.

Genus: Lasiosphaeria
Lasiosphaeria capensis Kalchbr. & Cooke
Lasiosphaeria hispida Fuck.

Genus: Lasmeniella
Lasmeniella globulifera Petrak & Syd.
Lasmeniella pterocarpi Petrak.

Genus: Laternea
Laternea angolensis Welw. & Curr.

Le
Family: Lecanactidaceae

Genus: Lecanactis (Lichens)
Lecanactis bullata Zahlbr.
Lecanactis develans Nyl.
Lecanactis diversa Nyl.
Lecanactis emersa Stizenb.
Lecanactis ulcerata Zahlbr.

Genus: Lecania (Lichens)
Lecania arenaria Flagey
Lecania cyrtella Th.Fr.
Lecania fructuosa Zahlbr.
Lecania punicea Müll.Arg.

Genus: Lecanora (Lichens)
Lecanora aequata Stizenb.
Lecanora albella Ach.
Lecanora albella f. angulosa Nyl.
Lecanora albospersa Stizenb.
Lecanora allophana Rohl.
Lecanora allophana var. glabrata Steiner.
Lecanora amphidoxa Stizenb.
Lecanora angulosa Ach.
Lecanora arenaria Nyl.
Lecanora armstrongiae Stizenb.
Lecanora asperella Nyl.
Lecanora aspersa Stizenb.
Lecanora atra Ach.
Lecanora atra var. americana Fee.
Lecanora atraeformis Vain.
Lecanora atrorimata Nyl.
Lecanora atrosulphurea Ach.
Lecanora atrosulphurea f. leptococca Stizenb.
Lecanora atrosulphurea f. livens Stizenb.
Lecanora aurantiaca Flotow.
Lecanora aurantiaca var. erythrella Nyl.
Lecanora aurantiaca var. fulva Nyl.
Lecanora aurantiaca var. placidium Stizenb.
Lecanora aureola Stirt.
Lecanora badia (Hoffm.) Ach. (1810) var. cinerascens Flot. (1849), accepted as Protoparmelia badia (Hoffm.) Hafellner (1984)
Lecanora benguellensis Nyl.
Lecanora bicincta Ram.
Lecanora blanda Nyl.
Lecanora bogotana Nyl.
Lecanora breuteliana Massal.
Lecanora bylii Vain.
Lecanora bylii Zahlbr.
Lecanora caesiopallens Vain.
Lecanora caesiorubella Ach.
Lecanora cancriformis Vain.
Lecanora candidata Stizenb.
Lecanora cameoflava Müll.Arg.
Lecanora carpinea Vain.
Lecanora cateileoides Vain.
Lecanora cervina Ach.
Lecanora chlarona Nyl.
Lecanora chlarona f. geographica Nyl.
Lecanora chlarona f. pinastri Cromb.
Lecanora chlarona var. bogotana Vain.
Lecanora chlarotera Nyl.
Lecanora chondroplaca Zahlbr.
Lecanora cinefacta Stizenb.
Lecanora cinerea Rohl.
Lecanora cinereocamea Stizenb.
Lecanora cinnabarina Ach.
Lecanora cinnabarina var. haematodes Stizenb.
Lecanora cinnabarina var. pallidior Stizenb.
Lecanora cinnabarina var. opaca Stizenb.
Lecanora cinnabarina var. perminiata Nyl.
Lecanora cinnabariza Nyl.
Lecanora clavulus Stizenb.
Lecanora coarctata Ach.
Lecanora coarctata f. cotaria Ach.
Lecanora coarctata f. fulgiana Zahlbr.
Lecanora coarctata var. argilliseda Duf.
Lecanora coarctata var. fossulans Stizenb.
Lecanora coccinella Stizenb.
Lecanora coilocarpa Nyl.
Lecanora confluens Stizenb.
Lecanora confragulosa Nyl.
Lecanora conspersa Stizenb.
Lecanora constans Nyl.
Lecanora crassildbra Müll.Arg.
Lecanora cruda Stizenb.
Lecanora deminuta Stizenb.
Lecanora deminutula Stizenb.
Lecanora detecta Stizenb.
Lecanora diffusilis Nyl.
Lecanora dispersa Rohl. f. nana Vain.
Lecanora dispersa f. testacea Vain.
Lecanora domingensis Ach.
Lecanora elaeophaea Nyl.
Lecanora elapheia Stizenb.
Lecanora elegantissima Nyl.
Lecanora epichlora Vain.
Lecanora erythrella Ach.
Lecanora erythroleuca var. subcerina Nyl.
Lecanora eudoxa Stizenb.
Lecanora euelpis Stizenb.
Lecanora exigua Rohl.
Lecanora expallens Ach.
Lecanora expallens var. lutescens Nyl.
Lecanora fenzliana Stizenb.
Lecanora ferruginea Link.
Lecanora ferruginea f. erysibe Stizenb.
Lecanora fibrosa Stizenb.
Lecanora ficta Stizenb.
Lecanora flava Stizenb.
Lecanora flavocrea Nyl.
Lecanora flavorubens Stizenb.
Lecanora flavovirens Fee.
Lecanora flexuosa Stizenb.
Lecanora fructuosa Stizenb.
Lecanora frustulosa Ach.
Lecanora galactiniza Nyl.
Lecanora gibbosa Nyl. var. subdepressa Nyl.
Lecanora glaucolivescens Nyl.
Lecanora glaucoma Ach.
Lecanora granulosa Wedd.
Lecanora helva Stizenb.
Lecanora homaloplaca Nyl.
Lecanora hufferiana Stizenb.
Lecanora hypocrocina Nyl.
Lecanora imponens Stizenb.
Lecanora impressa Zahlbr.
Lecanora labiosa Stizenb.
Lecanora laciniosa Nyl.
Lecanora lamprocheila Nyl.
Lecanora leprosa Fee.
Lecanora leptoplaca Zahlbr.
Lecanora leucoxantha Müll.Arg.
Lecanora leueoxantha Stizenb.
Lecanora leucoxanthalla Stizenb.
Lecanora lithagogo Nyl.
Lecanora lugens Stizenb.
Lecanora massula Stizenb.
Lecanora microlepida Stizenb.
Lecanora microps Stizenb.
Lecanora murorum Ach.
Lecanora murorum var. pusilla Wedd.
Lecanora nidulans Stizenb.
Lecanora nubila Stizenb.
Lecanora obvirescens Stizenb.
Lecanora ochracea Nyl. var. parvula Stizenb.
Lecanora odoardi Stizenb.
Lecanora oveina Ach.
Lecanora orichalcea Stizenb.
Lecanora ostracoderma Ach.
Lecanora pallescens Rohl.
Lecanora pallida Rabenh.
Lecanora parella Ach.
Lecanora perexigua Stiz.
Lecanora phlogina Nyl.
Lecanora placodina Zahlbr.
Lecanora poliotera Nyl.
Lecanora polytypa Vain.
Lecanora porinoides Stizenb.
Lecanora praemicans Nyl.
Lecanora prosecha Ach. var. homaloplaca Vain.
Lecanora psaromela Nyl.
Lecanora punicea Ach.
Lecanora punicea var. brevicula Stizenb.
Lecanora punicea var. collata Stirt.
Lecanora pyracea Nyl. f. picta Nyl.
Lecanora pyracea f. pyrithroma Nyl.
Lecanora pyracea var. picta Stizenb.
Lecanora pyropoecila Nyl.
Lecanora rehmannii Stizenb.
Lecanora robiginans Stizenb.
Lecanora roboris Nyl.
Lecanora rupicola Zahlbr.
Lecanora scorigena Nyl.
Lecanora scoriophila Stizenb.
Lecanora seductrir Stizenb.
Lecanora smaragdula Nyl.
Lecanora sophodes Nyl.
Lecanora sophodes var. atroalbida Nyl.
Lecanora sophodes var. roboris Duf.
Lecanora sphinctrina Nyl.
Lecanora subcarnea Ach.
Lecanora subcarnosa Ach.
Lecanora subdepressa Nyl.
Lecanora subfulgescens Nyl.
Lecanora subfusca Ach.
Lecanora subfusca var. allophana Ach.
Lecanora subfusca var. campestris Rabenh.
Lecanora subfusca var. cinereocarnea Müll.Arg.
Lecanora subfusca var. glabrata Sch.
Lecanora subfusca var. subcrenulata Nyl.
Lecanora subfusca var. subgranulata Nyl.
Lecanora subgranulata Nyl.
Lecanora subpunicea Stizenb.
Lecanora subsoluta Nyl.
Lecanora subunicolor Nyl.
Lecanora sylvestris Stizenb.
Lecanora teichophiloides Stizenb.
Lecanora tersa Nyl.
Lecanora thaeodes Stizenb.
Lecanora thiocheila Stizenb.
Lecanora varia Ach.
Lecanora vascesia Stizenb.
Lecanora vincentina Nyl.
Lecanora vitellina Ach.
Lecanora vulpina Nyl.
Lecanora xanthophana Nyl.
Lecanora zambesica Stizenb.

Family: Lecanoraceae (Lichens)

Genus: Lecidea (Lichens)
Lecidea acervata Stizenb.
Lecidea achristella Vain.
Lecidea aemula Stizenb.
Lecidea aeneola Vain. var. fuscoatrata Zahlbr.
Lecidea aethalea Nyl.
Lecidea aethaloessa Stizenb.
Lecidea affine Merrill.
Lecidea afra Stizenb.
Lecidea africana Tuck.
Lecidea albinea Stizenb.
Lecidea albocoerulescens Arn.
Lecidea albocoerulescens var. flavocoerulescens Schaer.
Lecidea albula Nyl.
Lecidea ambusta Stizenb.
Lecidea anatalodia Krempelb.
Lecidea angolensis Müll.Arg.
Lecidea anomala Ach.
Lecidea anteposita Nyl.
Lecidea aporetica Stizenb.
Lecidea armstrongiae Jones.
Lecidea atroalha Ach.
Lecidea atroalbella Nyl.
Lecidea alrovirens Ach.
Lecidea aurantiaca Ach.
Lecidea aureola Tuck.
Lecidea aurigera Fee.
Lecidea breviuscula Nyl.
Lecidea brugierae Vain.
Lecidea bumamma Nyl.
Lecidea buxea Stiz.
Lecidea caesiopallida Nyl.
Lecidea caledonica Zahlbr.
Lecidea callaina Stizenb.
Lecidea capensis Zahlbr.
Lecidea capreolina Stizenb.
Lecidea carneola Ach.
Lecidea caruncula Stizenb.
Lecidea caudata Nyl.
Lecidea chalybeia Borr.
Lecidea chlorophaeata Nyl.
Lecidea ckloropoliza Nyl.
Lecidea chlorotica Nyl.
Lecidea cinnamomea Stizenb.
Lecidea coccinella Hue.
Lecidea coeruleata Stizenb.
Lecidea confluens Hue.
Lecidea contingens Nyl.
Lecidea coroniformis Krempelh.
Lecidea crassa Stizenb.
Lecidea crenata Stizenb.
Lecidea crenata var. coroniformis Zahlbr.
Lecidea crenata var. speirea Stizenb.
Lecidea crustulata Sprengl.
Lecidea cyanocentra Nyl.
Lecidea cyrtocheila Stizenb.
Lecidea deceptoria Nyl.
Lecidea decipiens Ach.
Lecidea decrustulosa Vain.
Lecidea disciformis Nyl.
Lecidea disciformis var. sanguinea Stizenb.
Lecidea discolor Stizenb.
Lecidea dispersula Stizenb.
Lecidea distrata Nyl.
Lecidea domingensis Nyl.
Lecidea domingensis var.inexplicata Nyl.
Lecidea elaeochroma  Ach.
Lecidea elaeochroma f. flavicans Th.Fr.
Lecidea elaeochroma f. geographica Zahlbr. 
Lecidea elaeochroma var. hyalina Zahlbr.
Lecidea endoleuca Nyl.
Lecidea endoleucella Stizenb.
Lecidea enteroleuca Ach.
Lecidea enteroleuca var. geographica Bagl.
Lecidea elginensis Zahlbr.
Lecidea epichromatica Zahlbr.
Lecidea esuriens Zahlbr.
Lecidea euelpis Hue.
Lecidea exigua Chaub.
Lecidea exiguella Vain.
Lecidea finckei Zahlbr.
Lecidea flavocrocea Nyl.
Lecidea fucina Stizenb.
Lecidea fumosa Ach.
Lecidea fumosa var. mosigii Ach.
Lecidea fuscoatra Ach.
Lecidea fuscoatrata Nyl.
Lecidea fuscorubella Rohl.
Lecidea fuscorubescens Nyl.
Lecidea fuscolutea Ach.
Lecidea fuscotabulata Stizenb.
Lecidea geina Stizenb.
Lecidea geographica Rebent.
Lecidea geographica f. intermedia Stizenb.
Lecidea glebaria Stizenb.
Lecidea glencairnensis Zahlbr.
Lecidea glomerulosa Steud.
Lecidea goniophila Floerke.
Lecidea gouritzensis Vain.
Lecidea graniferna Wain.
Lecidea granulosula Nyl.
Lecidea grisella Floerke f. mosigii Zahlbr.
Lecidea griseofusciuscula Vain.
Lecidea guamensis Vain.
Lecidea halonia Ach.
Lecidea hereroensis Zahlbr.
Lecidea hereroensis f. genuina Zahlbr.
Lecidea hereroensis f. depauperata Zahlbr.
Lecidea howickensis Vain.
Lecidea hysbergensis Vain.
Lecidea icmadophila Ach.
Lecidea imponens Hue.
Lecidea impressa Krempelh.
Lecidea inconsequens Nyl.
Lecidea inconveniens Nyl.
Lecidea incretata Stizenb.
Lecidea incuriosa Nyl.
Lecidea inquilina Stizenb.
Lecidea inscripta Stizenb.
Lecidea insculpta Flotow.
Lecidea insculpta f. oxydata Flotow.
Lecidea intermedia Nyl.
Lecidea intermixta f. cyanocentra Nyl.
Lecidea italica Wedd.
Lecidea italica var. debanensis Stizenb.
Lecidea italica var. recobarina Stizenb.
Lecidea lactaria Stizenb.
Lecidea lactea Floerke.
Lecidea lactens Stizenb.
Lecidea langbaanensis Vain.
Lecidea laurocerasi Nyl. var. amylothelia Wain
Lecidea lenticularis var. nigroclavata Stizenb.
Lecidea leptobola Nyl.
Lecidea leucina Stizenb.
Lecidea leucostephana Stizenb.
Lecidea leucoxantha Spreng.
Lecidea lithagogo Wain.
Lecidea lutata Stizenb.
Lecidea lutea Tayl.
Lecidea luteola Ach.
Lecidea luteola var. chlorotica Ach.
Lecidea luteola f. conspondens Nyl.
Lecidea massula Hue.
Lecidea medialis Tuck.
Lecidea meiospora Nyl.
Lecidea melampepla Tuck.
Lecidea melanthina Stizenb.
Lecidea millegrana Nyl.
Lecidea minutula Nyl.
Lecidea montaqnei Flotow.
Lecidea mortualis Stizenb.
Lecidea mossamedana Wain.
Lecidea mutabilis Fee.
Lecidea myriocarpa Rohl.
Lecidea myriocarpa f. marcidula Nyl.
Lecidea nanosperma Stizenb.
Lecidea natalensis Nyl.
Lecidea nesiotis Stizenb.
Lecidea nigrella Stizenb.
Lecidea nigropallida Nyl.
Lecidea nitidula Fr.
Lecidea norrlinii Lamy.
Lecidea obumbrata Nvl.
Lecidea ocellata Floerke.
Lecidea ochriodea Stizenb.
Lecidea ochroplaca Zahlbr. var. intermedia Zahlbr.
Lecidea ochroplaca var. leprosa Zahlbr.
Lecidea ochroplaca var. polita Zahlbr.
Lecidea ochroxantha Nyl. f. aethiopica Stizenb.
Lecidea oligocheila Zahlbr.
Lecidea olivacea Massal.
Lecidea olivacea var. ambigua Lettau.
Lecidea olivacea Stizenb.
Lecidea opacata Stizenb.
Lecidea opalina Stizenb.
Lecidea orbiculata Stizenb.
Lecidea orichalcea Hue.
Lecidea owaniana Müll.Arg.
Lecidea pachnodes Stizenb.
Lecidea pachycarpa Fr.
Lecidea pallidonigra Ach.
Lecidea palmeti Stizenb.
Lecidea pantherina Ach.
Lecidea parasema Ach.
Lecidea parasema var. areolata Duf.
Lecidea parasema var. areolata Merrill.
Lecidea parasema var. atropurpurea Flotow.
Lecidea parasema var. elaeochroma Ach.
Lecidea parasema var. exigua Nyl.
Lecidea paraspeirea Stizenb.
Lecidea parmeliarum Sommerf.
Lecidea parvifolia Pers.
Lecidea parvifolia var. fibrillifera Nyl.
Lecidea parvifoliella Nyl.
Lecidea patellaria Stizenb.
Lecidea peltasta Stirt.
Lecidea peltoloma Müll.Arg.
Lecidea peltulidea Stirt.
Lecidea perforans Stizenb.
Lecidea perigrapta Stizenb.
Lecidea permodica Stizenb.
Lecidea phalerata Stizenb.
Lecidea placodina Nyl.
Lecidea porphyrea Mey.
Lecidea praelata Stizenb.
Lecidea praemicans Hue.
Lecidea procellarum Stizenb.
Lecidea promontorii Zahlbr.
Lecidea proposita Nyl.
Lecidea punieea Hue.
Lecidea quartzina Stizenb.
Lecidea remota Vain.
Lecidea rhynsdorpensis Zahlbr.
Lecidea rhyparoleuca Stizenb.
Lecidea rivulosa Ach.
Lecidea rudis Stizenb.
Lecidea rufata Stizenb.
Lecidea russula Ach.
Lecidea rusticorum Stizenb.
Lecidea sabuletorum Ach.
Lecidea santensis Tuck.
Lecidea schinziana Stizenb.
Lecidea speirea Ach.
Lecidea spuria Schaer.
Lecidea spuria var. insulans Stizenb.
Lecidea squamifera Stizenb.
Lecidea squamifera var. Bylii Zahlbr.
Lecidea stellans Stizenb.
Lecidea stellenboschiana Vain.
Lecidea stellulata Tayl.
Lecidea stellulata f. albosparsa Stizenb.
Lecidea stellulata f. hybrida Stizenb.
Lecidea stellulata f. murina Stizenb.
Lecidea stenospora Nyl. var. acutata Stizenb.
Lecidea stictella Stirt.
Lecidea stupparia Stizenb.
Lecidea styloumena Stirt.
Lecidea subalbicans Nyl.
Lecidea subalbula Nyl.
Lecidea subattingens Merrill.
Lecidea subceresina Zahlbr.
Lecidea subdisciformis Leight.
Lecidea subexigua Vain.
Lecidea subexiguella Vain.
Lecidea subfuscata Nyl.
Lecidea subinquinans Nyl.
Lecidea sublucida Stizenb.
Lecidea subluteola Nyl.
Lecidea subspadicea Stizenb.
Lecidea subsquamifera Zahlbr.
Lecidea subrussula Steiner.
Lecidea substylosa Zahlbr.
Lecidea subtristis Nyl.
Lecidea sulfurosula Stizenb.
Lecidea tenebrieosa Nyl.
Lecidea terrena Nyl.
Lecidea thaleriza Stirt.
Lecidea theichroa Vain.
Lecidea theiphoriodes Vain.
Lecidea tragorum Zahlbr.
Lecidea transvaalica Stizenb.
Lecidea trichiliae Zahlbr.
Lecidea trifaria Stizenb.
Lecidea triphragmia Nyl.
Lecidea tuberculosa Fee.
Lecidea tuberculosa f. geotropa Stizenb.
Lecidea valida Stizenb.
Lecidea vasquesia Hue.
Lecidea vemalis Ach.
Lecidea vernalis S.F.Gray.
Lecidea versicolor Nyl.
Lecidea vesicularis Ach.
Lecidea vestita Nyl.
Lecidea viridans Lamy var. nigrella Steiner.
Lecidea viridiatra Stizenb.
Lecidea volvarioides Stizenb.
Lecidea vorticosa Korb.
Lecidea vulgata Zahlbr.
Lecidea vulpina Tuck.
Lecidea woodii Stizenb.
Lecidea zeyheri Zahlbr.

Family: Lecideaceae(lichens)

Genus: Lecidella(lichens)
Lecidella nigrella Massal.

Genus: Lecideola
Lecideola flavescens Massal.

Genus: Lembosia
Lembosia congesta Wint.
Lembosia durbana v.d.Byl.
Lembosia natalensis Doidge
Lembosia phillipsii Doidge
Lembosia piriensis Doidge
Lembosia radiata Doidge
Lembosia wageri Doidge

Genus: Lembosina
Lembosina Rawsoniae Doidge

Genus: Lembosiopsis
Lembosiopsis eucalyptina Petrak & Syd.

Genus: Lentinus
Lentinus albidus Berk.
Lentinus capronatus Berk.
Lentinus cirrosus Fr.  
Lentinus dactyliophorus Lev.  
Lentinus fastuosus Kalchbr. & MacOwan
Lentinus flabelliformis Fr.  
Lentinus hyracinus Kalchbr.  
Lentinus lecomtei Fr.  
Lentinus lepideus Fr.  
Lentinus miserculus Kalchbr.  
Lentinus murrayi Kalchbr. & MacOwan.  
Lentinus natalensis v.d.Byl.  
Lentinus nigripes Fr.  
Lentinus phillipsii v.d.Byl.  
Lentinus sajor-caju Fr.  
Lentinus sajor-caju var. sparsifolius Pilat.
Lentinus sajor-caju var. typicus Pilat.  
Lentinus strigosus Fr.  
Lentinus stupeus Klotzsch.
Lentinus tigrinus Fr.  
Lentinus tuber-regium Fr.
Lentinus ursinus Fr.  
Lentinus velutinus Fr.
Lentinus villosus Klotzsch.  
Lentinus villosus var. zeyheri Pilat.
Lentinus woodii Kalchbr.
Lentinus zeyheri Berk.

Genus: Lenzites
Lenzites abietina Fr.
Lenzites alborepanda Lloyd.
Lenzites applanata Fr.
Lenzites aspera Klotszch.
Lenzites betulina (L.) Fr., (1838), accepted as Trametes betulina (L.) Pilát (1939)
Lenzites deplanata Fr.
Lenzites guineensis Fr.
Lenzites junghuhnii Lev.
Lenzites ochracea Lloyd
Lenzites palisoti Fr.
Lenzites repanda Fr.
Lenzites trabea (Pers.) Fr. (1838), accepted as Gloeophyllum trabeum (Pers.) Murrill (1908)
Lenzites tricolor Fr.

Genus: Leotia
Leotia elegantula Kalchbr.

Genus: Lepiota
Lepiota acutesquamosa Gill.   
Lepiota africana Kalchbr.  
Lepiota atricapilla Sacc.  
Lepiota cinereo-bubella Kalchbr. & MacOwan  
Lepiota cristata Quél.
Lepiota cuculliformis Sacc.
Lepiota excoriata Quél.  
Lepiota flava Beeli.  
Lepiota goossensiae Beeli.  
Lepiota gracilenta Quél.   
Lepiota hispida Gill.  
Lepiota ianthina Mass.  
Lepiota kunzei Sacc.  
Lepiota lutea (Bolton) Godfrin, (1897), accepted as Leucocoprinus birnbaumii (Corda) Singer, (1962) 
Lepiota magnannulata Sacc.  
Lepiota montagnei Sacc.  
Lepiota morgani Peck.  
Lepiota naucina Quél. (sic) could be Lepiota naucina var. cinerascens (Quél.) Konrad & Maubl. (194) accepted as Leucoagaricus cinerascens (Quél.) Bon & Boiffard, in Gams 1978, or Lepiota naucina (Fr.) P. Kumm. (1871), accepted as Leucoagaricus leucothites (Vittad.) Wasser (1977) 
Lepiota nympharum Kalchbr.  
Lepiota polysarca Sacc.  
Lepiota procera S.F.Grey. (sic)  could be Lepiota procera (Scop.) Gray (1821) accepted as Macrolepiota procera (Scop.) Singer (1948)
Lepiota pteropa Sacc.  
Lepiota purpurata Kalchbr.  
Lepiota sulfurella Sacc.  
Lepiota varians Sacc.  
Lepiota zeyheri Sacc.  
Lepiota zeyheri var. elegantula Sacc.  
Lepiota Lepiota zeyheri var. telosa Sacc.   
Lepiota zeyheri var. verrucellosa Sacc.  
Lepiota sp. 
 
Genus: Lepra
Lepra citrina Schaer.  
Lepra lactea DC.  
Lepra sulphurea Ehrht. 
 
Genus: Lepraria (Lichens)
Lepraria alba Ach.  
Lepraria candelaris Fr.   
Lepraria citrina Schaer.  
Lepraria crassa Nees.  
Lepraria flava Ach.  
Lepraria glaucella Ach.  
Lepraria xanthina Vain.
  
Genus: Leproloma
Leproloma lanuqinosum Nyl.
  
Genus: Leptogiopsis
Leptogiopsis brebissonii Müll.Arg.  
Leptogiopsis chloromeloides Müll.Arg.
 
Genus: Leptogium (Lichens)
Leptogium adpressum Nyl.  
Leptogium africanum Zahlbr.  
Leptogium azureum Mont.  
Leptogium brebissonii Mont.  
Leptogium bullatum Mont. 
Leptogium bullatum var. dactylinoideum Nyl.  
Leptogium burgesii Mont.  
Leptogium chloromeloides Nyl.  
Leptogium chloromelum Nyl.  
Leptogium chloromelum var. caespitosum Zahlbr.  
Leptogium chloromelum var. crassius Nyl.  
Leptogium daedaleum Nyl.  
Leptogium hildenbrandii Nyl.  
Leptogium kraussii Zahlbr.  
Leptogium marginellum S.F.Gray.  
Leptogium menziesii Mont.  
Leptogium menziesii f. fuliginosum Müll.Arg.  
Leptogium moluccanum Wain.  
Leptogium moluccanum var. simplicata Vain.  
Leptogium phyllocarpum Mont.  
Leptogium phyllocarpum var. coralloideum Hue.  
Leptogium phyllocarpum var. daedaleum Nyl.  
Leptogium phyllocarpum var. isidiosum Nyl.   
Leptogium phyllocarpum var. macrocarpum Nyl.  
Leptogium saturninum Nyl.  
Leptogium tremelloides S.F.Gray.  
Leptogium tremelloides var. azureum Nyl.  

Genus: Leptosphaerella
Leptosphaerella helichrysi Cooke. 

Genus: Leptosphaeria
Leptosphaeria anceps Sacc.  
Leptosphaeria caffra Thuem.  
Leptosphaeria cervispora Sacc.  
Leptosphaeria cinnamomi Shir. & Hara.  
Leptosphaeria coniothyrium Sacc.  
Leptosphaeria helichrysi Sacc.  
Leptosphaeria owaniae Sacc.  
Leptosphaeria protearum Syd.  
Leptosphaeria pterocelastri Doidge 
Leptosphaeria sacchari van Breda.  
Leptosphaeria salvinii Catt., (1879), accepted as Magnaporthe salvinii (Catt.) R.A. Krause & R.K. Webster, (1972) 
Leptosphaeria verwoerdiana du Pless.

Family: Leptostromataceae

Genus: Leptostromella
Leptostromella acaciae Syd.

Genus: Leptothyrium
Leptothyrium evansii Syd.  
Leptothyrium pomi (Mont. & Fr.) Sacc. (1880),accepted as Schizothyrium pomi (Mont. & Fr.) Arx, (1959)

Genus: Leptotrema (Lichens)
Leptotrema endoxanthellum Zahlbr.  
Leptotrema microglaenoides Zahlbr. 
 
Genus: Leveillina
Leveillina arduinae Theiss. & Syd. 
 
Genus: Leveillula
Leveillula taurica Am.

Genus: Levieuxia
Levieuxia natalensis Fr.

Li
Genus: Libertella
Libertella rhois Kalchbr.

Genus: Lichen
Lichen albus Roth.
Lichen atrovirens Linn.
Lichen barbatus Linn.
Lichen capensis Linn.f.
Lichen ceranoides Lam.
Lichen crispus Linn.
Lichen crocatus Linn.
Lichen divaricatus Thunb.
Lichen excavatus Thunb.
Lichen fastigiatus Pers.
Lichen fimbriatus Linn.
Lichen flammeus Linn.f.
Lichen flavicans Sw.
Lichen fragilis Wither.
Lichen fraxineus Linn.
Lichen gilvus Ach.
Lichen helopherus Ach.
Lichen hepaticus (= Endocarpon thunbergii Lam.)
Lichen hotentottus Ach.
Lichen incarnatus Thunb.
Lichen monocarpus Thunb.
Lichen opegraphus Lam.
Lichen pallidoniger Ach.
Lichen peltatus Lam.
Lichen peltatus (= Lecanora ostracoderma Lam.)
Lichen perforatus Wulf.
Lichen pertusus Thunb.
Lichen physodes Linn.
Lichen pulmonarius Linn.
Lichen pyxidatus Linn.
Lichen rangiferinus Linn.
Lichen roccella Linn.
Lichen rubiginosus Thunb.
Lichen scriptus Linn.
Lichen squarrosus Lam.
Lichen tabularis Thunb.
Lichen thunbergii Ach.
Lichen tomentosus Sw.
Lichen torulosus Thunb.
Lichen usnea Linn.
Lichen verruciger Gmel.
Lichen verrucosus Linn.f.
Lichen viridis Linn.f.

Lichenes Imperfectae

Genus: Limacinia
Limacinia nuxiae Doidge
Limacinia transvaalensis Doidge

Genus: Linderiella
Linderiella columnata G.H.Cunn.

Genus: Linochora
Linochora doidgei Syd.

Genus: Linochorella
Linochorella striiformis Syd.

Genus: Lithographa (Lichens)
Lithographa cerealis Stizenb.
Lithographa fumida Nyl.

Ll
Genus: Lloydella
Lloydella retiruga Bres.

Lo
Genus: Lobaria (Lichens)
Lobaria interversans Wain.
Lobaria isidiosa Wain.
Lobaria meridionalis Wain.
Lobaria patinifera Hue.
Lobaria pulnumacea Shirley.
Lobaria pulmonacea var. hypomela Stizenb.
Lobaria prdmonacea var. pleurocarpa Ach.
Lobaria pulmonaria Hoffm.
Lobaria pulmonaria f. hypomela Cromb.
Lobaria pulmonaria f. papillaris Hue.
Lobaria pulmonaria f. pleurocarpa Cromb.
Lobaria quercizans Michx.
Lobaria retigera  Trevis.
Lobaria verrucosa Holfm.

Genus: Lobarina
Lobarina retigera Nyl.
Lobarina retigera f. isidiosa Stizenb.
Lobarina scrobiculata Nyl.

Genus: Longia
Longia natalensis Syd.

Genus: Lopadium
Lopadium fuscoluteum Mudd.
Lopadium leucoxanthum Zahlbr. 
Lopadium mariae Zahlbr. 
Lopadium vulpinum Zahlbr. 
Lopadium woodii Zahlbr.
 
Genus: Lopharia
Lopharia javanica P. Henn. & E.Nym.
Lopharia lirellosa Kalchbr. & MacOwan.
Lopharia mirabilis Pat.
 
Family: Lophiostomataceae
 
Genus: Lophodermium
Lophodermium pinastri Chev.

Ly
Genus: Lycogala (amoebozoa)
Lycogala epidendrum Fr.
Lycogala flavo-fuscum Rost. 
Lycogala rufo-cinnamomeum Mass. 

Family: Lycogalaceae

Family: Lycoperdaceae
 
Order: Lycoperdales

Family: Lycoperdeae

Genus: Lycoperdon
Lycoperdon asperrimum Welw. & Curr.
Lycoperdon asperum de Toni.
Lycoperdon atroviolaceum Kalchbr.
Lycoperdon bicolor Welw. & Curr. 
Lycoperdon bovista Linn. 
Lycoperdon caespitosum Welw. & Curr. 
Lycoperdon caffrorum Kalchbr. & Cooke 
Lycoperdon capense Cooke & Mass. 
Lycoperdon capense Fr.
Lycoperdon carcinomale Linn.f. 
Lycoperdon cepaeforme Mass. 
Lycoperdon curreyi Mass. 
Lycoperdon curtisii Berk. 
Lycoperdon cyatihiforme Bose. 
Lycoperdon djurense P.Henn. 
Lycoperdon duthiei Bottomley. 
Lycoperdon endotephrum Pat. 
Lycoperdon eylesii Verw. 
Lycoperdon flavum Mass. 
Lycoperdon furfuraceum Schaeff. ex de Toni. 
Lycoperdon gardneri Berk. 
Lycoperdon gemmatum Batsch.
Lycoperdon glabellum Peck. 
Lycoperdon gunnii Berk. 
Lycoperdon hyemale Vitt. 
Lycoperdon laetum Berk. 
Lycoperdon lilacinum Mass. 
Lycoperdon multiseptum Lloyd.
Lycoperdon natalense Cooke & Mass. 
Lycoperdon natalense Fr. 
Lycoperdon oblongisporum Berk. & Curt. 
Lycoperdon perlatum Pers. 
Lycoperdon polymorphum Vitt. 
Lycoperdon pratense Pers. 
Lycoperdon pusillum Batsch ex Pers. 
Lycoperdon qudenii Bottomley. 
Lycoperdon radicatum Welw. & Curr. 
Lycoperdon retis Lloyd
Lycoperdon rhodesianum Verw. 
Lycoperdon saccatum Vahl. 
Lycoperdon subincamatum Peck. 
Lycoperdon umbrinum Pers. 
Lycoperdon welwitschii de Toni.

Genus: Lysurus
Lysurus borealis P.Henn.
Lysurus corallocephalus Welw. & Curr.
Lysurus gardneri Berk.
Lysurus woodii Lloyd.

References

Sources

See also
 List of bacteria of South Africa
 List of Oomycetes of South Africa
 List of slime moulds of South Africa

 List of fungi of South Africa
 List of fungi of South Africa – A
 List of fungi of South Africa – B
 List of fungi of South Africa – C
 List of fungi of South Africa – D
 List of fungi of South Africa – E
 List of fungi of South Africa – F
 List of fungi of South Africa – G
 List of fungi of South Africa – H
 List of fungi of South Africa – I
 List of fungi of South Africa – J
 List of fungi of South Africa – K
 List of fungi of South Africa – L
 List of fungi of South Africa – M
 List of fungi of South Africa – N
 List of fungi of South Africa – O
 List of fungi of South Africa – P
 List of fungi of South Africa – Q
 List of fungi of South Africa – R
 List of fungi of South Africa – S
 List of fungi of South Africa – T
 List of fungi of South Africa – U
 List of fungi of South Africa – V
 List of fungi of South Africa – W
 List of fungi of South Africa – X
 List of fungi of South Africa – Y
 List of fungi of South Africa – Z

Further reading
Kinge TR, Goldman G, Jacobs A, Ndiritu GG, Gryzenhout M (2020) A first checklist of macrofungi for South Africa. MycoKeys 63: 1-48. https://doi.org/10.3897/mycokeys.63.36566

  

Fungi
Fungi L